Sir Harry Goring, 6th baronet (1739-1824), of Highden, near Washington, Sussex, was an English politician.

He was a Member (MP) of the Parliament of Great Britain for New Shoreham 1790–1796.

References

1739 births
1824 deaths
People from Washington, West Sussex
Baronets in the Baronetage of England
Members of the Parliament of Great Britain for English constituencies
Viscounts in the Jacobite peerage
Alumni of Magdalen College, Oxford
People from Shoreham-by-Sea